The Xikou Township Cultural Life Center is a cultural center in Xikou Township, Chiayi County, Taiwan.

History
The construction of the center started in 2005 and was completed on 28 December 2007.

Transportation
The center is accessible west of Dalin Station of Taiwan Railways.

See also
 List of tourist attractions in Taiwan

References

2007 establishments in Taiwan
Buildings and structures in Chiayi County
Cultural centers in Taiwan
Event venues established in 2007
Tourist attractions in Chiayi County